The following are the records of Saint Vincent and the Grenadines in Olympic weightlifting. Records are maintained in each weight class for the snatch lift, clean and jerk lift, and the total for both lifts by the St. Vincent Amateur Weightlifting Association.

Men

Women

References

Saint Vincent and the Grenadines
weightlifting
weightlifting